Poyner may refer to:

People
 Bobby Poyner (born 1992), American baseball pitcher
 John Poyner (born 1933), English sound editor
 Syvasky Poyner (1956–1993), American spree killer

Places
 Poyner Township, Black Hawk County, Iowa, a rural township

Other uses
 Poyner v. Commissioner, a United States tax law case